Shadrach Nosa Ogie (born 26 August 2001) is an Irish professional footballer who plays as a defender for Leyton Orient.

Club career

Leyton Orient
Born in Limerick, Republic of Ireland, Ogie played youth football for local club Pike Rovers. Upon moving to England, Ogie played football in Hornchurch's youth academy, before joining Leyton Orient in 2018.

On 1 February 2019, after receiving international clearance from FIFA allowing him to play competitive football, Ogie signed a professional contract with Leyton Orient. The following day, Ogie made his debut for the club, playing 39 minutes in a 1–0 FA Trophy win against Blyth Spartans. In March 2019, Ogie was loaned out to Isthmian League club Bishop's Stortford, making seven appearances and scoring once.

Following Leyton Orient's promotion back into the English Football League, Ogie's first appearance of the 2019–20 season came in a 2–0 EFL Trophy win against Southend United.

Dover Athletic (loan)
On 17 January 2020, Ogie joined Dover Athletic on loan. He made his debut for the club in a 0-0 away draw at Notts County and scored his first goal for the club the following week with a superb solo effort in a 2–0 victory over Aldershot Town.

Aldershot Town (loan)
Ogie joined Aldershot Town on an initial one month loan deal on 3 October 2020. He made his debut that day as Aldershot lost 2–1 to Hartlepool United. On 4 November 2020, Ogie's loan was extended until the end of the 2020–21 season. He scored his first goal for the Shots on 12 December 2020 in a 3–2 league defeat to Boreham Wood and made it two in two matches the following week with a screamer in a 5–1 FA Trophy thrashing of Welwyn Garden City.

Contract extension
On 27 January 2022, Ogie signed a contract extension with Leyton Orient, which keeps him at the club until the end of the 2023–24 season.

International career
On 21 March 2019, Ogie made his debut for Republic of Ireland under-18's in a 4–0 loss against Turkey U18, a month after making his under-19 debut for Ireland on 5 February 2019.

Career statistics

References

2001 births
Living people
Association football defenders
Association footballers from County Limerick
Republic of Ireland association footballers
Black Irish sportspeople
Republic of Ireland youth international footballers
Leyton Orient F.C. players
Bishop's Stortford F.C. players
Dover Athletic F.C. players
Aldershot Town F.C. players
Isthmian League players
National League (English football) players
English Football League players